Olga Dmitrievna Arteshina (born 27 November 1982) is a Russian basketball player. Since 2000 she played in most international competitions for the Russian national team, except for the 2008 Olympics which she missed due to giving birth to a daughter; she won an Olympic bronze medal in 2004 and three gold and four silver medals at the world and European championships. At the club level she was the EuroLeague champion in 2005, 2013 and 2016.

References

1982 births
Living people
Russian women's basketball players
Olympic basketball players of Russia
Basketball players at the 2000 Summer Olympics
Basketball players at the 2004 Summer Olympics
Olympic bronze medalists for Russia
Sportspeople from Samara, Russia
Olympic medalists in basketball
Basketball players at the 2012 Summer Olympics
Medalists at the 2004 Summer Olympics